The 1964 United States Senate election in Delaware took place on November 3, 1964. Incumbent Republican U.S. Senator John J. Williams was narrowly re-elected to a fourth term in office over Democratic Governor Elbert Carvel in a rematch of the 1958 campaign.

General election

Candidates
Elbert Carvel, Governor of Delaware (Democratic)
Joseph B. Hollon (Socialist Labor)
John J. Williams, incumbent U.S. Senator (Republican)

Results

See also 
 1964 United States Senate elections

References

Delaware
1964
1964 Delaware elections